Sadiye Hanim was a Turkish politician. She was the Mayor of Kılıçkaya in Turkey (1930-1932) and she was the first woman mayor in Turkey.

References

20th-century Turkish women politicians
Women mayors of places in Turkey
Mayors of places in Turkey
Year of birth missing
Year of death missing